Vehicle cargo ship is a model of United States Navy ship used for the prepositioning of Army vehicles. An example of this is the USNS Bob Hope (T-AKR-300), the lead ship of her class.

 
Auxiliary ships of the United States Navy